The Kairos Quartet is a Berlin-based string quartet founded in 1996.

History 
The Kairos Quartet (initially "work in progress quartet") specialises in music from 1950 onwards. At the time of its foundation in 1996 it was the first string quartet with such an orientation in the German-speaking world. It is named after Kairos, in Greek mythology the god of the favourable moment and the embodiment of the subjective concept of time. The quartet made its debut at the Darmstädter Ferienkurse in Darmstadt in 1996, where it was also taught by the primarius of the Arditti Quartet. 

It has since collaborated with many composers, including Georg Friedrich Haas, György Kurtág, Helmut Lachenmann, Liza Lim, Sergej Newski, Enno Poppe and Wolfgang Rihm. The Kairos Quartet frequently performs at Neue Musik festivals in Europe and Mexico. In autumn 2018, the quartet made its debut in China with a concert and several workshops at the Shanghai Conservatory of Music. Its repertoire now includes over 150 compositions (as of spring 2019), including more than 60 premieres and commissioned works.

The Kairos Quartet is also actively involved in teaching Neue Musik, among others at the Zurich University of the Arts, the National Autonomous University of Mexico, the Universität Mozarteum Salzburg, the Shanghai Conservatory, the Xinghai Conservatory in Guangzhou, and the Berlin University of the Arts. It sets its own accents through self-organised concerts, alternative concert formats and concert series.

Members 
 Veronika Paleeva, violin (9/2021–12/2021: Daniella Strasfogel, 1996-2021: Wolfgang Bender)
 Alicja Pilarczyk, violin (2008–2021: Stefan Häussler, 6/2007–5/2008: Susanne Zapf, 1997–2007: Chatschatur Kanajan, 1996–1997: Kathrein Allenberg)
 Simone Heilgendorff, viola
 Claudius von Wrochem, violoncello
The violins alternate in the function of the first violin.

Prizes and scholarships 
 Kranichstein Scholarship
 German Record Critics' Prize 1/2005.
 Composition commissions from the Berlin Senate.
 Concerts of the German Music Council
 Scholarship holder of the Akademie Schloss Solitude 2000/2001 (as first ensemble)
 Sponsorship awards from the Ernst von Siemens Foundation
 Project funding by the Hauptstadtkulturfonds
 Project funding by the Foundation Deutsche Klassenlotterie Berlin
 Ensemble funding by the Senate of Berlin
 Ensemble funding by Deutsche Musikrat: NEUSTART for ensembles and bands

Recordings 
 Portrait of the Kairos Quartet at Edition Zeitklang 
 Georg Friedrich Haas: String Quartets 1 and 2 at Edition Zeitklang 
 Portrait of the composer Viera Janarcekova at ProViva
 Portrait of the composer Enno Poppe at col legno
 "Wider den Strich" ( among others Orm Finnendahl Fälschung for string quartet, laptop, ghetto blaster and live electronics (2003) at Red Seal
 Composer portrait Jay Schwartz at Wergo (German Music Council).
 Composer portrait Knut Müller: "Chamber Music" with Thorn [1996] (1st string quartet, recording from 2001, EZ), Zeug [1999] (2nd string quartet)2012 Edition Zeitklang
 "Klangnarbe" - composer portrait Marina Khorkova a. a. String Quartet No. 1 at Wergo (German Music Council).
 mientras" Schönberg String Quartet No. 2 and Sabine Panzer mientras with Angelika Luz (soprano) at Edition Zeitklang - www.zeitklang.de
 Recordings and productions on most German broadcasters as well as ORF, RAI, DRS and the BBC.

References

External links 
 
 

German string quartets
Musical groups established in 1996